The Christian Cultural Center (CCC) is a non-denominational Christian megachurch located in the Starrett City section of Brooklyn, New York City, with a satellite campus in Smithtown on Long Island. It is the largest Evangelical church in New York City.

History
The Christian Cultural Center was founded in 1978 by Dr. A. R. Bernard. In 2000, it opened its main building, with a 5,000-seat auditorium.  In 2022, the church claims over 32,000 members.

References

External links
 Christian Cultural Center's official site

Evangelical megachurches in the United States
Megachurches in New York (state)
Churches in Brooklyn
Christian organizations established in 1978
20th-century Protestant churches
East New York, Brooklyn